The cortical alveoli (singular: cortical alveolum) are cellular organelles composed of vesicles located under the cytoplasmic membrane, to which they give support. They have been defined as membrane sacs that strengthen the cellular cortex through the firm fixation to the underlying membrane and microtubules. They typically form a continuous layer that acts as a flexible film, although they can also constitute a semi-rigid structure or the scales of a theca.

The cortical alveoli are present in protists of the chromist group Alveolata, whose name references these organelles. Although cortical alveoli are very diverse in shape and function among the different groups of protists, they always share the function of supporting the cytoplasmic membrane. In the case of apicomplexan parasites, they're related to the mobility and facilitate the invasion of host cells, thus they have a considerable importance in medicine. In dinoflagellates the alveoli contain cellulose and compose the scales of their armor. Lastly, in cilliates they are part of the cortical complex that supports the extrusomes, the basal bodies of the cilia and the intricate cortical shell.

The term "corticate" comes from an evolutionary hypothesis about the common origin of kingdoms Plantae and Chromista (united by the clade Corticata or Diaphoretickes), because both kingdoms have cortical alveoli in at least one phylum.

References

Organelles